Sardar Khan's Roza or Nawab Sardar Khan's Mosque and Tomb, is a mosque and tomb complex in Jamalpur area of Ahmedabad, India.

History and architecture 
Sardar Khan was a minister of Ahmedabad during Mughal rule. He did not provide help to Mughal prince Dara Shikoh, who fled from captivity of Aurangzeb.

Sardar Khan's Roza was built in 1685. The tomb of Sardar Khan was built of stone and had a marble floor. The mosque was made of bricks situated on high platform, and the façade of the mosque had three pointed arches and two minarets on either side. The minarets were four storeys high, which were octagonal at the base and circular in the upper parts. This minaret had gilt balls on the top and had three large onion shaped domes, while the gateway had two domes too. The tomb and mosque have been encroached since 1884 and are in bad shape now.

References 

Mosques in Ahmedabad
Religious buildings and structures completed in 1685
Monuments of National Importance in Gujarat